Where the Light Gets In may refer to:

 Where the Light Gets In a 2016 album by Jason Gray
 "Where the Light Gets In" (song), by Primal Scream
 Where the Light Gets In: Losing My Mother Only to Find Her Again, a memoir by Kimberly Williams-Paisley